The 2012 Central Hockey League All-Star Game was held on January 11, 2012, at Tim's Toyota Center in Prescott Valley, Arizona, home of the Arizona Sundogs, in the 2011–12 CHL season. The Sundogs lost 6–4 to the CHL's All-Stars.

References

External links
 Official Site of the Arizona Sundogs
 Official Site of the Central Hockey League

All-Star Game
Central Hockey League All-Star Games